Enfilade is a military formation laterally exposed to enemy fire.

Enfilade may also refer to:

Enfilade (architecture), a suite of rooms along the same axis
Enfilade (Xanadu), a type of computational data structure
Enfilade (song), a 2000 song by At the Drive-In